Bruno Coutinho (born 6 October 1969) is an Indian football player from Goa, and winner of the Arjuna Award in 2001, a national Indian award for excellence in sport.

Former Indian captain

Coutinho studied in Monte De Guirim, who was recognized by coach Paul Raj, he played his 1st game against school rivals ST.Pilar, having scored 3 goals and winning Subroto Mukerjee Cup Football tournament u17.

Coutinho has also been a former Indian football captain. His much-watched career has spanned nearly a decade-and-half. He first played for India at a school tournament at Brunei in 1987. Joining the prominent Goan team Dempo SC in 1988, he moved to another prominent mining-linked Salgaocar team in 1987.

Diminutive striker

Coutinho has been called a "diminutive striker". His international debut came in 1989–90, and his last match for India was in the Millennium Cup in 2001. Bruno is credited with helping Salgaocar win the Federation Cup in 1987, the Rovers Cup in 1989 and 1996, the Taca Goa in 1989 and the 1998 National Football League in India.

Representing, leading India

Among Coutinho's other achievements are representing India in the President's Cup in 1989 in Dhaka, heading the Indian Under-23 team for the 1991 pre-Olympics, for the SAF Games in 1995 and 1996 and the Asia Cup in Malaysia.

Coutinho was the All India Football Federation player of the year when he played for Salgaocar Sports Club of Goa in the year 1996.

Transfers

In August 2002 it was reported that Coutinho was transferring from his traditional Salgaocar Sports Club to the Vasco Sports Club. Both clubs are located in Goa. In 2003 he became a coach.

Personal life

He is married and has two children, and also a brother (Jeronimo Coutinho) who runs a sports bar in Goa called J29.

Honours

India
SAFF Championship: 1997, 1999; runner-up: 1995
 South Asian Games Gold medal: 1995; Bronze medal: 1999

Salgaocar
Federation Cup: 1997

Individual
 AIFF Player of the Year: 1996
 Arjuna Award: 2001

References

External links
 End of road for Bruno Coutinho?
Bruno AIFF award winner in 2002
Politician pays tribute to Bruno Coutinho

Living people
1969 births
India international footballers
Indian footballers
Indian Roman Catholics
Recipients of the Arjuna Award
Footballers from Goa
Association football forwards
Salgaocar FC players
Dempo SC players
South Asian Games medalists in football
South Asian Games gold medalists for India
South Asian Games bronze medalists for India